Osvaldo Fernando Saturnino de Oliveira (born 14 January 1956), commonly known as Jesús, is an Angolan former football player and coach who played as a striker.

He mainly played for Petro de Luanda and the Angola national team, having also moved to Portugal at Varzim and Oliveirense.

Club career 
Jesús played youth football for Clube Atlético de Luanda; he then began playing professionally in 1974 for local club Luanda, before moving to Benfica de Luanda and Terra Nova.

Jesús played over 10 years for Petro de Luanda. He was top goalscorer of the Girabola three times with them, in 1982, 1984 and 1985. In 1988, he moved to Portugal to play for Varzim aged 32, with whom he played two seasons. Jesús then played one season for Oliveirense, retiring in 1990.

Managerial career 
Jesús was appointed interim coach of Petro de Luanda, following the death of coach Gojko Zec, helping them win the league title in 1995.

Presidency career 
After six terms as vice-president of the Angolan Football Federation, in 2016 Jesús announced his candidacy for president.

Personal life 
Jesús and his partner got married in Luanda in 1983; they had a son, Hadja. His idol is Portuguese footballer Cristiano Ronaldo.

Career statistics

International 

Scores and results list Angola's goal tally first, score column indicates score after each Jesús goal.

Honours

Player 
Petro de Luanda
 Girabola: 1982, 1984, 1986, 1987, 1988
 Taça de Angola: 1987
 Supertaça de Angola: 1987

Individual
 CAF Legends award: 2009
 Girabola top goalscorer: 1982, 1984, 1985

Coach 
 Girabola: 1995

See also
 List of Angola international footballers

References

External links
 Jesús at RSSSF
 

1956 births
Living people
Footballers from Luanda
Angolan footballers
Association football forwards
Clube Atlético de Luanda players
F.C. Luanda players
S.L. Benfica (Luanda) players
Atlético Petróleos de Luanda players
Varzim S.C. players
U.D. Oliveirense players
Girabola players
Liga Portugal 2 players
Angola international footballers
Angolan football managers
Atlético Petróleos de Luanda managers
Girabola managers
Angolan expatriate footballers
Angolan expatriate sportspeople in Portugal
Expatriate footballers in Portugal